Renea bourguignatiana is a species of land snail with an operculum, a terrestrial gastropod mollusk in the family Aciculidae. The survival of this species is threatened by habitat loss.

References

Renea (gastropod)
Gastropods described in 1880
Taxonomy articles created by Polbot
Critically endangered animals